A History of the World in the 20th Century is a history textbook by J. A. S. Grenville, first published in 1994.
It is followed by A History of the World from the 20th to the 21st Century, which has reached its 5th edition, and is commonly used in International Baccalaureate 20th Century World History classes.

Table of contents
Social change and national rivalry in the West, 1900–1914
The response of China and Japan to western dominance
The Great War, revolution and the search for stability
The continuing world crisis, 1929–1939
The Second World War
Post-war Europe, 1945–1947
The United States and the beginning of the Cold War, 1945–1948
The transformation of Asia, 1945–1955
The ending of European dominance in the Middle East, 1919–1980
The Cold War : superpower confrontation, 1948–1964
The recovery of Western Europe in the 1950s and 1960s
Who will liberate the Third World? : 1954-1968
Two faces of Asia : after 1949
Latin America after 1945 : problems unresolved
Africa after 1945 : conflict and the threat of famine
The United States and the Soviet bloc after 1963 : the great transformation
Western Europe gathers strength : after 1968
The Cold War and after

References

Publication data
A History of the World in the Twentieth Century, Belknap Press of Harvard University Press (2000), 1002 p.,  
A History of the World From the Twentieth to the Twenty-first Century, Routledge (2005), 995 p., 

History textbooks
1994 non-fiction books